Orlando Jacob Heinitz (August 27, 1921 – October 10, 2007) was an American politician and businessman.

Henitz was born in Mountain Lake, Minnesota and graduated from Mountain Lake High School. He served in the United States Army during World War II. Heinitz received his bachelor's degree from University of Minnesota in  economics and personal psychology. Heinitz was an employment counselor and was involved with the real estate business. Heinitz, his wife, and family lived in Wayzata, Minnesota. He served in the Minnesota House of Representatives from 1969 to 1985 and was a Republican. In 1986, he and his wife moved to Green Valley, Arizona. Heinitz died in Green Valley, Arizona.

Notes

1921 births
2007 deaths
People from Green Valley, Arizona
People from Mountain Lake, Minnesota
People from Wayzata, Minnesota
Businesspeople from Minnesota
Military personnel from Minnesota
University of Minnesota College of Liberal Arts alumni
Republican Party members of the Minnesota House of Representatives
20th-century American politicians
20th-century American businesspeople
United States Army personnel of World War II